Ham-Nord, Quebec is a township municipality in the Centre-du-Québec region of Quebec, Canada.

Demographics 

References

(Google Maps)

External links

Township municipalities in Quebec
Incorporated places in Centre-du-Québec